Czerwieniec  is a village in the administrative district of Gmina Potęgowo, within Słupsk County, Pomeranian Voivodeship, in northern Poland.

The village has a population of 138.

References

Czerwieniec